Leucadendron globosum, the Grabouw conebush, is a flower-bearing shrub belonging to the genus Leucadendron. It forms part of the fynbos biome. The plant is native to the Western Cape, South Africa.

Description

The plant dies after a fire but the seeds survive. The seeds are stored in a toll on the female plant and fall after two months after flowers are formed from the toll to the ground. The plant is unisexual and there are separate plants with male and female flowers, which are pollinated by insects.

Distribution and habitat
The plant occurs from Grabouw to Houhoek Pass in the Elgin valley.

References

External links
Threatened Species Programme | SANBI Red List of South African Plants
Leucadendron globosum (Grabouw conebush)
Crown Conebushes

globosum
Taxa named by Henry Cranke Andrews